The Meeting Point (Sabirni centar) is a 1989 Yugoslavian fantasy/comedy-drama film directed by Goran Marković and starring Rade Marković, Bogdan Diklić, Dragan Nikolić, Mirjana Karanović and Anica Dobra. It is based on Dušan Kovačević's play of the same title translated in the U.S. as The Gathering Place.

Plot 
An archaeological team, digging in a remote village and led by an old professor, unearths an old Roman artifact, a gravestone bearing some mysterious inscriptions. After realizing that they have stumbled upon something precious, the professor collapses with a heart attack. Seemingly dead for people around him, he finds himself in a sort of afterlife state and realizes that the stone marked a passage into the classical underworld so he starts mingling with the antique spirits of the dead. The spirits themselves appear just as silly and petty as the peasants from the village above them, and in their desire to see what happened to their descendants, they find themselves surprised by the modern world of the living.

Cast 
 Rade Marković - Profesor Misa
 Bogdan Diklić - Petar
 Dragan Nikolić - Janko
 Olivera Marković - Angelina
 Danilo Stojković - Simeun 
 Aleksandar Berček - Ivan
 Radmila Živković - Lepa
 Mirjana Karanović - Jelena Katic
 Dusan Kostovski - Marko 
 Anica Dobra - Milica
 Branko Pleša - Doktor Katic
 Goran Daničić - Keser
 Kole Angelovski - Macak

Production 
Movie scenes of The Meeting Point filmed in Gamzigrad, and several actors of them actually went to Tunisia where they filmed scenes from the desert and the ruins of a Roman city Dougga. Catacombs from Labyrinth are made in a studio in Košutnjak.

Awards 
At the 1989 Pula Film Festival (the Yugoslavian version of the Academy Awards), the film won the Big Golden Arena awards for Best Film, Best Screenplay (Dušan Kovačević) and  Best Actress in a Supporting Role (Radmila Živković).

References

External links 
 

1989 films
1980s fantasy comedy-drama films
Avala Film films
Serbian fantasy comedy-drama films
Serbo-Croatian-language films
Films based on works by Dušan Kovačević
Films directed by Goran Marković
Films with screenplays by Dušan Kovačević
Yugoslav comedy-drama films
Yugoslav fantasy films
Films set in Yugoslavia
Films about the afterlife
Films about archaeology